The 20th Frigate Squadron was an administrative unit of the Royal Navy from 1961 to 1966.

Operational history
The squadron was responsible for the advanced training of officers in anti-submarine warfare and for the evaluation of modern anti-submarine equipment. Although operational from Derry, the ships assigned to the squadron continued to carry out their refits and intermediate dockings at their base ports (HMNB Devonport, Portsmouth and Rosyth).

During its service, the squadron included Type 14, Type 15 and  frigates.

Squadron commander

See also
 List of squadrons and flotillas of the Royal Navy

References

Frigate squadrons of the Royal Navy